Bulbophyllum mastersianum is a species of orchid.

mastersianum